Neurigona pallida is a species of long-legged fly in the family Dolichopodidae.

References

Neurigoninae
Insects described in 1823
Taxa named by Carl Fredrik Fallén